Michael Gerard Duignan (born 15 July 1970) is an Irish Roman Catholic prelate who has served as Bishop of Clonfert since 2019 and additionally as Bishop of Galway and Kilmacduagh since 2022.

Early life
Duignan was born in Athlone, County Roscommon, on 15 July 1970, the eldest of six children. He attended Cloonakilla National School in Bealnamulla and St. Aloysius College in Athlone, before studying for the priesthood at St. Patrick's Society for the Foreign Missions in Kiltegan, County Wicklow, and the Pontifical Gregorian University in Rome.

Duignan was ordained as a priest for the Diocese of Elphin on 17 July 1994.

Presbyteral ministry 
After completing a licentiate in dogmatic theology in 1995, Duignan's first pastoral assignments were as a curate in the cathedral parish in Sligo and chaplain to the local Institute of Technology, before returning to Rome to complete doctoral studies in contemporary trinitarian theology at the Pontifical Gregorian University.

Duignan returned to Ireland in 2001, serving as a curate in the parish of Cliffoney and teaching theology, philosophy and religious education at St Angela's College, before being appointed full-time lecturer in religious education and chaplain at St Angela's College in 2005, and subsequently its director of religious education, theology and chaplaincy programmes. In the same year, he was also appointed assistant diocesan secretary for the Diocese of Elphin.

Duignan was appointed diocesan director of the permanent diaconate in 2008, and subsequently national director in 2014. In the same year, he was also appointed chancellor, diocesan secretary and episcopal vicar for education and formation for the Diocese of Elphin, and subsequently as financial administrator in 2018.

Episcopal ministry

Bishop of Clonfert 
Duignan was appointed Bishop-elect of Clonfert by Pope Francis on 16 July 2019. He received episcopal ordination from his predecessor, John Kirby, on 13 October in St Brendan's Cathedral, Loughrea.

Bishop of Clonfert and Galway and Kilmacduagh 
Following the announcement by Pope Francis on 16 November 2021 that the Dioceses of Clonfert and Galway, Kilmacduagh and Kilfenora would be united in persona episcopi, the first-ever union of its kind in Ireland, Duignan was appointed Bishop of Galway and Kilmacduagh and Apostolic Administrator of Kilfenora in addition to his appointment as Bishop of Clonfert on 11 February 2022. 

He was installed on 1 May in the Cathedral of Our Lady Assumed into Heaven and St Nicholas, Galway.

Notes

References

External links 

 Bishop Michael Gerard Duignan on Catholic-Hierarchy.org
 Bishop Michael Duignan on GCatholic

1970 births
Living people
21st-century Roman Catholic bishops in Ireland
Alumni of St Patrick's College, Maynooth
Pontifical Gregorian University alumni
People from Athlone
Roman Catholic bishops of Clonfert